In linguistics, a phatic expression is a communication which primarily serves to establish or maintain social relationships. In other words, phatic expressions have mostly socio-pragmatic rather than denotational functions. They can be observed in everyday conversational exchanges, as in, for instance, exchanges of social pleasantries that do not seek or offer information of intrinsic value but rather signal willingness to observe conventional local expectations for politeness.

Other uses of the term include the category of "small talk" (conversation for its own sake) in speech communication, where it is also called "grooming talking." In Roman Jakobson's work, the 'phatic' function of language concerns the channel of communication; for instance, when one says "I can't hear you, you're breaking up" in the middle of a cell-phone conversation. This usage appears in research on online communities and micro-blogging.

Purpose
Phatic communion at first appears to break Grice's conversational maxims, because it denotationally appears to give information that is unnecessary, untrue, or irrelevant. However, phatic communion plays an important role in language and has important connotational meanings that do not break these maxims and needs to be understood as an important part of language in its role in establishing, maintaining, and managing bonds of sociality between participants, as well as creating feelings of solidarity and familiarity, and putting participants at ease.

History
The term phatic communion ('bonding by language') was coined by anthropologist Bronisław Malinowski in his essay "The Problem of Meaning in Primitive Languages", which appeared in 1923 as a supplementary contribution to The Meaning of Meaning by C. K. Ogden and I. A. Richards. The term phatic means 'linguistic' (i.e.

Importance of context
Many expressions generally considered to be phatic (see below) may be a genuine request for information in certain contexts. For example, in British English, "How are you?" is a phatic expression used when greeting someone one knows, especially when a participant wants to initiate conversation. However, it can be asked sincerely, and this must be inferred from context, such as when a friend gives bad news, or tone, such falling intonation to show it as a genuine question (as is with w/h-word questions), or speaking more quietly. Authenticity of the question can also be emphasised by the addition of the word "feeling" ("How are you feeling?").

Phatic expressions in various languages

Danish
Danish has several phatic greetings:

  'how goes it?'. Possible answers are:  'it goes good/fine'.
  'how does it cut?' Informal greeting between close friends.
  'what then?'. Similar to the English greeting what's up?. More often used in Jutland. A possible answer is  'not that much'.
  is a common informal greeting and equivalent to the English hi, pronounced almost the same. Single word greetings with approximately the same meaning include  (from combining  with German  from French ),  (both reduced forms of  meaning 'day'),  (Pun greeting. Made by combining  and  'onion sauce'),  'nice good day' is a more formal greeting.
  is only used when the speaker is not sure they can be heard. Examples when saying/yelling  is appropriate: Trying to find out if someone else is in a seemingly empty room/building; using it as an initial phone greeting; checking if the person you're calling can still hear you (when experiencing a bad phone connection); trying to get the attention of a listener that appears to not pay attention.
 Mojn is only used in Southern Jutland. It comes from North German  from the German word  meaning 'morning'. Despite its original meaning it is used as a greeting throughout the day. 
'we will see each other' is used as a farewell greeting in face-to-face conversations while  'we will speak each other'/ 'we will speak to each other by' are used in both face-to-face and phone/text conversations. 
  'drive safely' is said to a person leaving the place where the speaker is located and going to drive/bike to another location.  'come well home' is said in the same situation whatever the method of transportation.
  'good lust for work' is said when parting with a person that is either currently at work or leaving to go to work.
  'thanks for today' is often said in more formal contexts of prolonged interactions like at the end of a meeting or the end of a class. 
  'thanks for the last time that we were together' acknowledging that the people were together somewhere
  'good recovery'. Said when leaving a sick person.
  'have it good' or  'you (sg./pl.) may have it good' is a farewell phrase wishing for the other's well-being. A joke variant of this is  'have it as you look' (literally: 'have it as you look out'). By not saying the expected adjective  'good', the speaker is violating the maxim of quantity and thereby inferring that they do not think the listener looks good. This can be understood as an insult and is therefore mainly used informally between friends.

Some phatic greetings are only used in writings such as letters, e-mails and speeches read aloud:

  'dear' followed by a name is a formalised way of beginning a letter, speech etc.
Others include  'with loving greeting' abbreviated ,  'hug'.

Some greetings like  can be used throughout the day. Some are more specific, and the specific time of when to switch to the next greeting can vary from speaker to speaker. Time-specific greetings include 

Ways of saying thanks include  'thanks',  'thanks shall you have',  'many thanks',  'thousand thanks',  'thanks for that' and  'I thank'.  A thanks can be answered with  'self thanks' or  'it was so little' (referring to the small amount of work that had to be done).

English
"You're welcome", in its phatic usage, is not intended to convey the message that the hearer is welcome; it is a phatic response to being thanked, which in turn is a phatic whose function is to acknowledge the receipt of a benefit.

Similarly, the question "how are you?" is usually an automatic component of a social encounter. Although there are times when "how are you?" is asked in a sincere, concerned manner and does in fact anticipate a detailed response regarding the respondent's present state, this needs to be pragmatically inferred from context and intonation.

Example: a simple, basic exchange between two acquaintances in a non-formal environment:

Speaker one: "What's up?" (US English. In UK English this more commonly means "Is there something wrong?")
Speaker two: "Hey, how's it going?" (In US English "Hey" is equivalent to "Hi", or "Hello". Adding "How's it going" returns the initial greeting-query, paraphrased, without offering any information about what is possibly "up". In short, the first speaker's token is replied to with the second speaker's equivalent token, not actually answering the first speaker's literal query.)

Or:

Speaker one: "All right?" (UK English. In US English this can only be a tag question, approximately meaning "Do you agree with or accept what I've said?" In the US, the longer question "(Are) you all right?" is possible to mean "Is something wrong?")
Speaker two: "Yeah, all right."

In both dialogues neither speaker expects an actual answer to the question but rather it is an indication that each has recognized the other's presence and has therefore sufficiently performed that particular social duty.

Icelandic 
There are several phatic greetings in Icelandic differing in formality:

  'What say you (good)?'. Equal to English how are you?. To a foreign speaker it can seem strange that the preferred answer,  'good', is embedded in the question. A preferred answer can be  'I say everything good/fine'
  'how goes?'.

Thanking:

  'thanks for'.

Japanese

In Japanese, phatic expressions play a significant role in communication, for instance the backchannel responses referred to as aizuchi. Other such expressions include the ubiquitous  ('please treat me well', used before starting work with someone),  (lit.

Mandarin Chinese 
In China, the phatic expression  'have you eaten?' is equivalent to English speakers how are you? Food culture is important in China and thus inquiring if one is well-fed implies the speaker's desire to know if the listener has this basic need met. This expression is most often used by older members of society towards younger persons.

Persian

Taarof is a complex set of expressions and other gestures in Persian society, primarily reflected in the language.

Welsh

The use of  phatic has been used as a Welsh language campaigners to encourage Welsh speakers to begin conversations in Welsh, and for non-fluent speakers to "give it a go". Shwmae Sumae Day was held for the first time in 2013 and is held annually on 13 October.

In fiction
Phatic expressions are often created by authors, particularly in science fiction or fantasy, as part of their worldbuilding.

 In A Song of Ice and Fire by George R. R. Martin, the people of Essos use the expression Valar Morghulis ('All men must die'), answered with Valar Dohaeris ('All men must serve').
 In the Star Wars series, "May the Force be with you" is used as a leave-taking phrase.
 In Star Trek, the expression "live long and prosper" is used phatically, accompanied by a Vulcan salute.

Non-verbal phatic expressions
Non-verbal phatic expressions are used in nonverbal communication for emphasis or to add detail to the message that a person conveys or expresses. Common examples of these are smiling, gesturing, waving, etc. According to Dr. Carola Surkamp, professor at University of Cologne, non-verbal phatic communication can be expressed with involuntary physical features such as direction of gaze, blushing, posture, etc. and that these have a vital function in regulating conversation.

Online phatic expressions
Phatic expressions are used on different communication platforms on the internet such as social media networks where certain platforms require and prompt certain actions to be made between users to communicate or implicate certain messages between people without direct utterances. Examples for this would be: 'likes', comments/replies, shares/reblogs, emoji use, etc. These phatic posts as Radovanovic and Ragnedda like to call them, are again used with a social function of social communicative upkeep with the primary function of expressing social connection, relationships between users, and recognition of coparticipants.

See also 
 Backchannel (linguistics)
 Filler (linguistics)
 Literal and figurative language
 Pragmatics (linguistics)
 Small talk
 Sociolinguistics

References

Anthropology
Pragmatics